So Kam Tong (born 8 June 1937) is a Hong Kong racewalker. He competed in the men's 50 kilometres walk at the 1964 Summer Olympics.

References

External links
 

1937 births
Living people
Athletes (track and field) at the 1964 Summer Olympics
Hong Kong male racewalkers
Olympic athletes of Hong Kong
Place of birth missing (living people)